This is a list of Belgian television related events from 1964.

Events

Debuts

Television shows

Ending this year

Births
28 September - Andrea Croonenberghs, actress & singer
25 October - Peter Van Den Begin, actor
21 December - Kris Wauters, co-host of Idool

Deaths